Winsted may refer to a location in the United States:

 Winsted, Connecticut
 Winsted (Aberdeen, Maryland), a home on the National Register of Historic Places
 Winsted, Minnesota

See also
 Winstead (disambiguation)
 Winstedt, a surname